is a railway station on the Hidaka Main Line in Tomakomai, Hokkaido, Japan, operated by the Hokkaido Railway Company (JR Hokkaido).

History
Tomakomai Light Railway opened the station on October 1, 1913. On December 2, 1962, the station was moved to the present location due to rerouting of the line.

References

Railway stations in Japan opened in 1913
Railway stations in Hokkaido Prefecture
Stations of Hokkaido Railway Company